The Minister for Industrial Relations  is a Minister of the Crown in the Government of New South Wales who has responsibilities for matters relating to industrial and labour laws and regulation in the state of New South Wales, Australia. The portfolio was established in 1895 in the Reid ministry and titled Minister for Labour and Industry, held in conjunction with the Minister of Public Instruction. The current minister, since 21 December 2021, is Damien Tudehope who is also the Minister for Finance, the Vice-President of the Executive Council, and the Leader of Government Business in the Legislative Council. The minister is responsible for assisting the Premier and the Treasurer in the administration of their respective clusters.

Ultimately the Minister is responsible to the Parliament of New South Wales.

History
The 1890s in New South Wales were a period of depression, with soaring unemployment and poverty, accompanied by industrial disputes and strikes, such as the bitter and prolonged 1890 Australian maritime dispute, the 1891 and 1894 shearers' strikes and the 1892 Broken Hill miners' strike.The Government Labour Bureau was established in February 1892 in response to the soaring unemployment and poverty brought on by the depression, with its principal tasks being in finding work for the unemployed and assisting families. There was also a legislative response, such as Trade Disputes Conciliation and Arbitration Act 1892, Apprentices Act 1894, and the Factories and Shops Act 1896.

The portfolio was established to be responsible for industrial registration, safety in the workplace, and the labour exchange, including the Government Labour Bureau.

Industrial relations in NSW was affected by the WorkChoices legislation and the Fair Work Act, which saw the Commonwealth assume responsibility for private sector employment matters. In 2017 Industrial Relations came within The Treasury and the portfolio was abolished in 2019 and merged into the portfolio of Minister for the Public Service and Employee Relations, Aboriginal Affairs, and the Arts. At the time of its abolition, the minister was Dominic Perrottet, who was also the Treasurer, since 30 January 2017.

The ministry was reestablished in December 2021.

List of ministers

References

External links
 NSW Industrial Relations

1895 establishments in Australia
Employee Relations